Frederick R. Roat   (November 10, 1867 – September 24, 1913) was a Major League Baseball third baseman. His minor league career lasted as late as 1899 with two stops in the majors in 1890 and 1892.

Sources

Major League Baseball third basemen
Pittsburgh Alleghenys players
Chicago Colts players
Baseball players from Illinois
1867 births
1913 deaths
19th-century baseball players
Danville Browns players
Rockford Hustlers players
Lincoln Rustlers players
Milwaukee Brewers (minor league) players
New Orleans Pelicans (baseball) players
Indianapolis Hoosiers (minor league) players
Indianapolis Indians players
Grand Rapids Bob-o-links players
Minneapolis Millers (baseball) players
Omaha Omahogs players
St. Joseph Saints players
Toronto Maple Leafs (International League) players
Minor league baseball managers
People from Oregon, Illinois